Doug DeMartin (born July 4, 1986 in Mason, Michigan) is an American soccer player who last played for Portland Timbers in the USSF Division-2 Professional League.

Career

College and amateur
DeMartin played college soccer at Michigan State University for four years from 2004 to 2008, where he scored 38 goals and tallied 85 points. During his senior season at Michigan State he was named Big Ten Player of the Year, Offensive Player of the Big Ten Championship, NSCAA second team All-America, as well as First-Team ESPN The Magazine Academic All-America.

During his college years he also spent three seasons in the USL Premier Development League, playing for West Michigan Edge and the Michigan Bucks.

Professional
DeMartin was drafted in the second round (22nd overall) of the 2009 MLS SuperDraft by the Kansas City Wizards,

After a year out of competitive soccer DeMartin signed with USSF D2 Pro League club Portland Timbers in February 2010.

References

External links
 Portland Timbers bio
 Michigan State bio
 Doug DeMartin Nominated for National Player of the Year Award, Michigan State University

1986 births
Living people
American soccer players
Association football forwards
Flint City Bucks players
Michigan State Spartans men's soccer players
People from Mason, Michigan
Portland Timbers (2001–2010) players
West Michigan Edge players
Soccer players from Michigan
Sporting Kansas City draft picks
USL League Two players
USSF Division 2 Professional League players